Magela Baudoin (Caracas, January 3, 1973) is a Bolivian author who has won the Gabriel García Márquez Spanish American Short Story Award for her collection La composición de la sal (Salt's Composition).

Her book El sonido de la H won the National Novel Award in 2014.

Books
El sonido de la H
La composición de la sal (published in English as Sleeping Dragons)

References

Living people
1973 births
Bolivian short story writers
21st-century Bolivian women writers
Bolivian novelists